Grab It Indie Games Magazine is a digital video game magazine for iPad. It was launched in December 2013 by Chris Stead as both a downloadable app and as a website. 
Grab It Indie Games Magazine soft-launched with a free sample episode 1, featuring République on the cover. Episode 2 released in February 2014 with Thralled on the cover. Episode 3 released in early April 2014 with Monument Valley (video game) on the cover. Episode 4 released in late April 2014, with Last Inua on the cover.

Origins
Ahead of the launch of Issue 1, Chris Stead spoke with MCV Pacific about his motivations behind leaving Game Informer to launch Grab It Indie Games Magazine, noting that "it's difficult to talk about indie games in a commercial media outlet in any meaningful way.

As of May 2014, Grab It's review scores average slightly higher that other media outlets on Metacritic.

References

External links
Grab It Magazine Website

Video game magazines published in Australia
Online magazines
Magazines established in 2013
Monthly magazines published in Australia
2013 establishments in Australia